171 (one hundred [and] seventy-one) is the natural number following 170 and preceding 172.

In mathematics
171 is a triangular number and a Jacobsthal number.

There are 171 transitive relations on three labeled elements, and 171 combinatorially distinct ways of subdividing a cuboid by flat cuts into a mesh of tetrahedra, without adding extra vertices. 

The diagonals of a regular decagon meet at 171 points, including both crossings and the vertices of the decagon.

There are 171 faces and edges in the 57-cell, an abstract 4-polytope with hemi-dodecahedral cells that is its own dual polytope.

Within moonshine theory of sporadic groups, the friendly giant  is defined as having cyclic groups ⟨  ⟩ that are linked with the function,
This generates 171 moonshine groups within  associated with  that are principal moduli for different genus zero congruence groups commensurable with the projective linear group .

See also
 The year AD 171 or 171 BC
 List of highways numbered 171

References 

Integers